Asher Waterman Harman, Jr. (September 6, 1850 – April 11, 1917) was the Treasurer of Virginia for a period of thirty-one years. Originally appointed by the General Assembly, Treasurer became an elected office under the state's 1902 Constitution; he was elected as a Democrat in 1905 and subsequently reelected until his death in 1917.

References

External links

1850 births
1917 deaths
Politicians from Staunton, Virginia
Virginia Democrats
State treasurers of Virginia
Virginia Military Institute alumni
19th-century American Episcopalians